Kari Rasmussen (5 October 1932 – 2 March 2021) was a Norwegian singer and actress.

Personal life
Rasmussen was born in Skedsmo, a daughter of factory owner Gunnar Rasmussen and Lena Thyvold. In 1971 she married actor Ole-Jørgen Nilsen.

Career  
Rasmussen made her concert debut in 1956 in Vienna. She was assigned with the Gelsenkirchen Opera House for six years, and her operatic career includes performing in the operas La bohème (as Mimi), in Orfeo ed Euridice (as Euridice) and in The Magic Flute (as Pamina). From 1969 until her retirement she was assigned with Det Norske Teatret in Oslo, where she was best known for her musical roles.

Rasmussen died in March 2021.

References

1932 births
2021 deaths
People from Skedsmo
20th-century Norwegian women opera singers
Norwegian actresses
Norwegian expatriates in Germany